Love in Magic is a 2005 South Korean romantic comedy film.

Plot 
The movie tells of a womanizing performing magician Woo Ji-hoon who one day discovers a hidden camera film on the Internet that shows him having sex with one of his former girlfriends, Koo Hee-won in a motel. Ji-hoon first tracks down Hee-won, who is working as a teacher at a local school. They decide that instead of going to the police, they'd be better off trying to track the film's makers themselves and get the film taken offline without making a fuss, since both of their careers could suffer. Ji-hoon and Hee-won start spending their evenings going through all the motels they visited while going out, and slowly rediscover their feelings for each other.

Cast 
 Park Jin-hee as Koo Hee-won
 Yeon Jung-hoon as Woo Ji-hoon
 Jo Mi-ryung as Lee Seon-hee
 Ha Dong-hoon (aka Haha) as Park Dong-sun
 Oh Yoon-ah as Kim Hyun-joo
 Kim Ji-seok as Yoon Woo-suk
 Choi Sung-kook as Han Joon-seok
 Choi Won-young as Han Joon-seok
 Park Yong-soo as Koo Hee-won's father
 Lee Kyung-jin as Koo Hee-won's mother
 Kim Ha-eun as Koo Mi-young
 Kang Jae-seop as Mi-young's boyfriend
 Kim Ji-young as sexy woman at the bar
 Kim Yong-hoon as Yoon Woo-suk's classmate
 Choi Eun-joo	
 Choi Yeo-jin
 Shim Hyung-tak
 Jung Ui-gap

External links 
 
 
 

2005 films
2000s Korean-language films
South Korean romantic comedy films
2000s South Korean films